Abinashpur is a village and gram panchayat in Suri II CD Block in Suri Sadar subdivision of Birbhum district in the Indian state of West Bengal.

Geography

Location
Purandarpur, the CD Block headquarters, is 4 km away from Abinashpur. Suri, the district headquarters, is 17 km away.

Gram panchayat
Villages in Abinashpur gram panchayat are: Abinashpur, Badilpur, Bholaipur, Harishpur, Hatikra, Imadpur, Kasherhat, Kubirpur, Parbatipur, Rajpur, Sekampur and Srikantapur.

Demographics
As per the 2011 Census of India, Abinashpur had a total population of 1,846 of which 915 (50%) were males and 931 (50%) were females. Population below 6 years was 217. The total number of literates in Abinashpur was 1,240 (76.12% of the population over 6 years).

Education
Abinashpur Sriram High School, a Bengali-medium co-educational institution, was established in 1926. It has arrangements for teaching from class VI to class XII. The school has 15 computers and a library with 3,200 books. It is housed in a government building.

Healthcare 
Sultanpur Rural Hospital at PO Abinashpur has 30 beds. There are primary health centres at Purandarpur (10 beds) and Patanda (PO Ikra) (6 beds).

References

Villages in Birbhum district